David Gibson (29 September 1895 – 26 September 1964) was a Scottish footballer who played as a left back, initially for hometown team Kilmarnock where he played for seven seasons between 1919 and late 1925 (Joe Nibloe establishing himself in the position thereafter). He had a short spell at Preston North End before moving to the American Soccer League where he featured for Springfield Babes, Fall River Marksmen and Providence Clamdiggers over five years, returning to Scotland in 1932 with Queen of the South and Galston (both then playing in the Scottish Football Alliance league).

He won the Scottish Cup with Kilmarnock in 1920 and the U.S. Open Cup with Fall River in 1927.

References

1895 births
1964 deaths
Footballers from Kilmarnock
Association football defenders
Scottish footballers
Shawfield F.C. players
Kilmarnock F.C. players
Falkirk F.C. players
Preston North End F.C. players
Fall River Marksmen players
Springfield Babes players
Providence Clamdiggers players
Scottish Junior Football Association players
Scottish Football League players
English Football League players
Scottish expatriate sportspeople in the United States
Expatriate soccer players in the United States
Scottish expatriate footballers
American Soccer League (1921–1933) players